Valencia CF did not succeed in defending their La Liga title, finishing in slumped 5th place. Los Che also got to the quarter finals of the UEFA Champions League, where former coach Héctor Cúper and Inter got the upper hand over Valencia and Rafael Benítez. The main player during the season was Pablo Aimar, who was the only player making waves in the season, where the previously solid defense did not perform as previously.

Squad

Transfers

Competitions

La Liga

League table

Results by round

Matches

Copa del Rey

Round of 64

Round of 32

UEFA Champions League

First group stage

Group B

Second group stage

Group B

Quarter-finals

Statistics

Players statistics

References 

Valencia CF seasons
Valencia